Johanna Wood (born 25 December 1960) is a New Zealand sports administrator who serves in the FIFA Council since 2019. Wood was elected to the FIFA Council during the OFC Extraordinary Congress in Auckland on 9 March 2019, to serve from 2019 to 2023. She is currently president of the New Zealand Football, having served as chair of the Central Football Federation since 2010. Wood is the first New Zealander elected to the FIFA Council since Charlie Dempsey, who served from 1996 to 2000.

References

External links

1960 births
Living people
Sports executives and administrators
FIFA officials
Women FIFA officials